Andrew H. Marcus (born 1967) is a physical chemist  whose multidisciplinary research on the faculty at the University of Oregon explores macromolecular dynamics in biological environments.

Early life and education 
In 1987, Marcuse received a B.A. from the University of California, San Diego. He earned a Ph.D. in physical chemistry at Stanford University in 1994 with advisor Michael D. Fayer. His dissertation was titled, Probing the structure of bulk polymers and alloys using electronic excitation transport. His postdoctoral work at the University of Chicago, James Franck Institute, was advised by Stuart A. Rice.

Career 
Marcus held a postdoctoral research position at the University of Chicago before joining the Department of Chemistry and Biochemistry faculty at the University of Oregon in 1996.

His research interests are interdisciplinary among the Departments of Chemistry and Biochemistry, Physics, and the Oregon Center for Optical Molecular & Quantum Science. His group examines "the structure and dynamics of macromolecules in biological environments", and he collaborates with faculty in Chemistry and Physics departments, "studying the ultrafast dynamics of excited electronic-vibrational states in coupled molecular networks, which are structurally ordered in DNA".

Selected publications

Awards, honors 

 1997 Research Corporation Innovation Award
 1999 NSF CAREER Award
 2001 Innovative Polymer Research Lecturer, National Institutes of Standards and Technology
 2014 University of Wisconsin John L. Schrag Memorial Lectureship
 2014 Fund for Faculty Excellence Award
 2014 Interdisciplinary Research Award, UO Office of Research, Innovation and Graduate Education
 2014 Elected Fellow of American Physical Society. Citation: For his contribution to the development of linear and nonlinear fluorescence correlation spectroscopies, and their application to the study of the structure and dynamics of biochemical systems.

References 

1967 births
American physical chemists
Living people
University of Oregon faculty
University of California, San Diego alumni
Stanford University alumni
Fellows of the American Physical Society